Khaling Gewog (Dzongkha: ཁ་གླིང་) is a gewog (village block) of Trashigang District, Bhutan. Khaling and Lumang Gewogs comprise Wamrong Dungkhag (sub-district).

References 

Gewogs of Bhutan
Trashigang District